This is a list of 496 species in Dasineura, a genus of gall midges in the family Cecidomyiidae.

Dasineura species

 Dasineura aberrata (Felt, 1908) i c g
 Dasineura abiesemia (Foote, 1956) i c g
 Dasineura abietiperda (Henschel, 1880) c g
 Dasineura acaciaelongifoliae (Skuse, 1890) c g
 Dasineura acerifolia (Felt, 1907) c g
 Dasineura acerifoliae (Felt, 1907) i c g
 Dasineura aceris (Shimer, 1868) i c g
 Dasineura acerobia (Kovalev, 1967) c g
 Dasineura acrophila (Winnertz, 1853) c g
 Dasineura acuminata (Rübsaamen, 1916) c g
 Dasineura adenophorae (Kovalev, 1967) c g
 Dasineura affinis (Kieffer, 1886) c g
 Dasineura airae (Kieffer, 1897) c g
 Dasineura alatavica Fedotova, 1990 c g
 Dasineura albohirta (Felt, 1908) i c g
 Dasineura albovittata (Walsh, 1864) i c g
 Dasineura alliicola Fedotova, 1993 c g
 Dasineura alopecuri (Reuter, 1895) i c g
 Dasineura alpestris (Kieffer, 1909) c g
 Dasineura altajensis Fedotova, 1997 c g
 Dasineura alyssi (Kieffer, 1901) c g
 Dasineura amaramanjarae Grover, 1965 c g
 Dasineura americana (Felt, 1913) i c g
 Dasineura ammodendronae Fedotova, 1993 c g
 Dasineura andrieuxi (Tavares, 1902) c g
 Dasineura anemone (Felt, 1907) i c g
 Dasineura angelicae (Rübsaamen, 1916) c g
 Dasineura anglica (Kieffer, 1909) c g
 Dasineura antennata (Felt, 1908) i c g
 Dasineura aparines (Kieffer, 1889) c g
 Dasineura aparinicola Fedotova, 1997 c g
 Dasineura apicata (Felt, 1908) i c g
 Dasineura armoraciae (Vimmer, 1936) c g
 Dasineura aromaticae (Felt, 1909) i c g
 Dasineura artemisiae (Rübsaamen, 1916) c
 Dasineura asparagi (Tavares, 1902) c g
 Dasineura asparagiiflora Fedotova, 1993 c g
 Dasineura asperulae (Low, 1875) c g
 Dasineura asteriae (Shinji, 1942) c g
 Dasineura astericola (Kieffer, 1909) c g
 Dasineura astragalorum (Kieffer, 1909) c g
 Dasineura atraphaxiflorae Fedotova, 1984 c g
 Dasineura attenuata (Felt, 1908) i c g
 Dasineura aucupariae (Kieffer, 1909) c g
 Dasineura augusta (Felt, 1908) i c g
 Dasineura auricomi (Kieffer, 1909) c g
 Dasineura aurihirta (Felt, 1908) i c g
 Dasineura auritae (Rübsaamen, 1916) c g
 Dasineura axillaris (Kieffer, 1896) c g
 Dasineura azutavica Fedotova, 1996 c g
 Dasineura balsamicola (Lintner, 1888) i c g
 Dasineura balsamifera (Felt, 1908) i c g
 Dasineura banksiae Kolesik, 2007 c g
 Dasineura barbareae Stelter, 1992 c g
 Dasineura bayeri (Rübsaamen, 1914) c g
 Dasineura beccariella (Guercio, 1918) c g
 Dasineura berberidis (Kieffer, 1909) c g
 Dasineura berestae Fedotova, 1993 c g
 Dasineura berteroae (Stelter, 1976) c g
 Dasineura berti Sylven, 1993 c g
 Dasineura betuleti (Kieffer, 1886) c g
 Dasineura bidentata (Felt, 1907) i c g
 Dasineura bistortae (Kieffer, 1909) c g
 Dasineura borealis (Felt, 1907) i c g
 Dasineura bragancae (Tavares, 1904) c g
 Dasineura brassicae (Winnertz, 1853) c g
 Dasineura braziliensis (Tavares, 1922) c g
 Dasineura broteri (Tavares, 1901) c g
 Dasineura brunellae (Kieffer, 1909) c g
 Dasineura bupleuri (Wachtl, 1883) c g
 Dasineura bursakovi Fedotova, 1996 c g
 Dasineura bursifex (Kieffer, 1909) c g
 Dasineura californica (Felt, 1908) i c g
 Dasineura callistemoni Hills-Hayes, 2017 g
 Dasineura callitridis Kolesik, 2000 c g
 Dasineura calophacifoliae Fedotova, 1989 c g
 Dasineura campanulae (Rübsaamen, 1914) c g
 Dasineura campanularum (Kieffer, 1909) c g
 Dasineura canadensis (Felt, 1907) c g
 Dasineura capsulae (Kieffer, 1901) c g
 Dasineura carbonaria (Felt, 1907) i c g b
 Dasineura cardaminicola (Rübsaamen, 1916) c g
 Dasineura cardaminis (Winnertz, 1853) c g
 Dasineura cardariae Fedotova, 1994 c g
 Dasineura caricicola (Kieffer, 1913) i c g
 Dasineura caricis (Kieffer, 1901) c g
 Dasineura carpesii (Kieffer, 1909) c g
 Dasineura carpophaga (Tripp, 1955) i c g
 Dasineura cecconiana (Kieffer, 1909) c g
 Dasineura cedri Coutin, 2000 c g
 Dasineura centaureae (Kieffer, 1909) c g
 Dasineura cephalanthi (Felt, 1908) c g
 Dasineura cerastii (Binnie, 1877) c g
 Dasineura cerastiiflora Fedotova, 1993 c g
 Dasineura cercocarpi (Felt, 1913) i c g
 Dasineura cereocarpi (Felt, 1913) c g
 Dasineura chilensis (Kieffer & Herbst, 1909) c
 Dasineura chinquapin (Beutenmuller, 1907) i c g
 Dasineura chrysanthemi (Heath, 1962) c g
 Dasineura chrysophyllae (Guercio, 1918) c g
 Dasineura cirsioni (Felt, 1908) i c g
 Dasineura citri (Rao & Grover, 1960) c g
 Dasineura citrigemina Yang & Tang, 1991 c g
 Dasineura citrigemmia Yang & Tang, 1991 c g
 Dasineura clematidina (Kieffer, 1913) c g
 Dasineura clematidis (Felt, 1908) i c g
 Dasineura clematifolia Fedotova, 1985 c g
 Dasineura coffeae (Barnes, 1939) c g
 Dasineura collinsoniae (Beutenmuller, 1908) i g
 Dasineura columnae (Kieffer, 1909) c g
 Dasineura communis (Felt, 1911) i c g b  (gouty vein midge)
 Dasineura comosae (Rübsaamen, 1916) c g
 Dasineura consobrina (Felt, 1907) i g
 Dasineura copacabanensis Maia, 1993 c g
 Dasineura copiosa Fedotova, 1996 c g
 Dasineura corniculata (Kieffer, 1909) c g
 Dasineura corollae Gagne, 1977 c g
 Dasineura coronillae (Tavares, 1901) c g
 Dasineura corticis (Felt, 1909) i c g
 Dasineura corylina (Kieffer, 1913) c g
 Dasineura cotini Janezic, 1979 c g
 Dasineura cotoneasteris Fedotova, 1990 c g
 Dasineura couepiae Maia, 2001 c g
 Dasineura crataegi (Winnertz, 1853) c g
 Dasineura crataegibedeguar (Osten Sacken, 1878) i b
 Dasineura cyanococci (Felt, 1907) i c g
 Dasineura cystiphorae Fedotova, 1985 c g
 Dasineura cytisi (Kieffer, 1909) c g
 Dasineura dactylidis (Metcalfe, 1933) c g
 Dasineura daphnephila (Kieffer, 1909) c g
 Dasineura daphnes (Kieffer, 1901) c g
 Dasineura dentatae (Stebbins, 1910) i c g
 Dasineura denticulata (Felt, 1907) i c g
 Dasineura dianthi (Kieffer, 1909) c g
 Dasineura dielsi (Rübsaamen, 1916) c g
 Dasineura dioicae (Rübsaamen, 1895) c g
 Dasineura dombrovskae Fedotova, 1985 c g
 Dasineura dryophila (Rübsaamen, 1917) c g
 Dasineura dzhanokmenae Fedotova, 1994 c g
 Dasineura elatostemmae (Felt, 1921) c g
 Dasineura elegans (Tavares, 1907) c g
 Dasineura emilyae (Gagne, 1985) c g
 Dasineura engstfeldi (Rübsaamen, 1889) c g
 Dasineura epilobii (Low, 1889) c g
 Dasineura ericaescopariae (Dufour, 1837) c g
 Dasineura erigerontis (Rübsaamen, 1912) c g
 Dasineura erodiicola Sylven, 1993 c g
 Dasineura erysimicola Fedotova, 1994 c g
 Dasineura eugeniae (Felt, 1912) i c g
 Dasineura euphorbiarum (Kieffer, 1909) c g
 Dasineura excavans (Kieffer, 1909) c g
 Dasineura ezomatsue (Uchida & Inouye, 1954) c g
 Dasineura fairmairei (Kieffer, 1897) c g
 Dasineura fastidiosa Roskam, 1979 c g
 Dasineura fedtshenkoi Fedotova, 1984 c g
 Dasineura festucae (Barnes, 1939) c g
 Dasineura filicae (Felt, 1907) i c g
 Dasineura filiciae (Felt, 1907) c g
 Dasineura filicina (Kieffer, 1889) c g
 Dasineura filipendulae (Kieffer, 1909) c g
 Dasineura fistulosa Kolesik, Adair & Eick, 2005 c g
 Dasineura flavescens (Felt, 1908) i c g
 Dasineura flavicornis (Felt, 1908) i c g
 Dasineura flavoabdominalis (Felt, 1908) i c g
 Dasineura flavoscuta (Felt, 1908) i c g
 Dasineura floralis (Marikovskij, 1956) c g
 Dasineura florida (Felt, 1908) i c g
 Dasineura foliumcrispans (Rübsaamen, 1895) c g
 Dasineura folliculi (Felt, 1908) i c g
 Dasineura frangulae (Kieffer, 1917) c g
 Dasineura frauenfeldi Schiner, 1868 g
 Dasineura fraxinea (Kieffer, 1907) c g
 Dasineura fraxini (Bremi, 1847) c g
 Dasineura fraxinifolia (Felt, 1907) i c g
 Dasineura fructicola (Kieffer, 1909) c g
 Dasineura fructum (Rübsaamen, 1895) c g
 Dasineura fulva (Felt, 1908) i c g
 Dasineura fulvicola (Shinji, 1938) c g
 Dasineura furcata Kolesik, Adair & Eick, 2005 c g
 Dasineura fusca (Rübsaamen, 1914) c g
 Dasineura galeopsis (Kieffer, 1897) c g
 Dasineura galiicola (Low, 1880) c g
 Dasineura gallica (Kieffer, 1909) c g
 Dasineura gardoquiae (Kieffer & Herbst, 1905) c g
 Dasineura geisenheyneri (Kieffer, 1904) c g
 Dasineura gemmae (Felt, 1909) i c g
 Dasineura genistarum (Kieffer, 1909) c g
 Dasineura gentianae (Kieffer, 1909) c g
 Dasineura gentneri (Pritchard, 1953) i c g
 Dasineura geranii (Kieffer, 1907) c g
 Dasineura gibsoni (Felt, 1911) i c g
 Dasineura gigantea Angelo & Maia, 1999 c g
 Dasineura giraudi (Frauenfeld, 1863) c g
 Dasineura glandis (Felt, 1908) i c g
 Dasineura glauca Kolesik, Adair & Eick, 2005 c g
 Dasineura glechomae (Kieffer, 1889) i c g
 Dasineura gleditchiae (Osten Sacken, 1866) i c g b  (honeylocust podgall midge)
 Dasineura globosa Maia, 1996 c g
 Dasineura glomerata Kolesik, Adair & Eick, 2005 c g
 Dasineura glyciphyli (Rübsaamen, 1912) c g
 Dasineura glycyrrhizicola Fedotova, 1985 c g
 Dasineura gmelinii Fedotova, 1992 c g
 Dasineura gossypii (Felt, 1916) c
 Dasineura gracilicornis (Kieffer & Herbst, 1905) c g
 Dasineura graminis (Felt, 1908) i c g
 Dasineura grasseti (Barnes, 1935) c g
 Dasineura halimii (Tavares, 1902) c g
 Dasineura halimodendronifolia Fedotova, 1990 c g
 Dasineura harrisoni (Bagnall, 1922) c g
 Dasineura hebefolia (Lamb, 1951) c g
 Dasineura helenae Sylven, 1993 c g
 Dasineura helianthemiflorae Fedotova, 1991 c g
 Dasineura herminii (Tavares, 1902) c g
 Dasineura hirticornis (Felt, 1909) i c g
 Dasineura hisarenis Sharma & Singh, 1991 c g
 Dasineura hisarensis Sharma, 1991 c g
 Dasineura holosteae (Kieffer, 1909) c g
 Dasineura hybanthi Kolesik & Skuhrava, 1997 c g
 Dasineura hygrophila (Mik, 1883) c g
 Dasineura hyperici (Bremi, 1847) c g
 Dasineura hyssopi (Kieffer, 1909) c g
 Dasineura ilicis (Tavares, 1919) c g
 Dasineura incola Fedotova, 1990 c g
 Dasineura inflata Stelter, 1986 c g
 Dasineura ingeris Sylven & Lovgren, 1995 c g
 Dasineura interbracta Roskam, 1979 c g
 Dasineura inventa Fedotova, 1996 c g
 Dasineura investita  b
 Dasineura irregularis (Bremi, 1847) c g
 Dasineura ivashenkoae Fedotova, 1996 c g
 Dasineura jaapi (Rübsaamen, 1914) c g
 Dasineura jujubifolia Jiao & Bu g
 Dasineura karnerensis (Felt, 1908) i c g
 Dasineura kellneri (Henschel, 1875) c g
 Dasineura kiefferi (Marchal, 1896) c g
 Dasineura kiefferiana (Rübsaamen, 1891) c g
 Dasineura kleini (Rübsaamen, 1892) c g
 Dasineura koesterbecki Stelter, 1986 c g
 Dasineura kungeica Fedotova, 1993 c g
 Dasineura lamii (Kieffer, 1909) c g
 Dasineura lamiicola (Mik, 1888) c g
 Dasineura lappulae Fedotova, 1993 c g
 Dasineura lathierei (Guercio, 1910) c g
 Dasineura lathyri (Kieffer, 1909) c g
 Dasineura lathyricola (Rübsaamen, 1890) c g
 Dasineura lathyrina (Rübsaamen, 1890) c g
 Dasineura leguminicola (Lintner, 1879) i c g
 Dasineura lenkiewicziae (Debski, 1918) c g
 Dasineura lepidii (Felt, 1908) i c g
 Dasineura lepidiis Fedotova, 1992 c g
 Dasineura ligulariae Fedotova, 1993 c g
 Dasineura lini (Barnes, 1936) c g
 Dasineura linosyridis (Möhn, 1958) c g
 Dasineura lithospermi (Loew, 1850) c g
 Dasineura loewiana (Rübsaamen, 1917) c g
 Dasineura loewii (Mik, 1882) c g
 Dasineura loniceraegemmae Fedotova, 1991 c g
 Dasineura lotharingiae (Kieffer, 1888) c g
 Dasineura lupini (Felt, 1916) i c g
 Dasineura lupinorum Gagne, 1993 c g
 Dasineura lupulinae (Kieffer, 1891) c g
 Dasineura luteofusca (Rondani, 1840) c g
 Dasineura lysimachiae (Beutenmuller, 1907) i c g
 Dasineura mali (Kieffer, 1904) i c g
 Dasineura marginalis Maia, 2005 c g
 Dasineura marginata (Felt, 1908) i c g
 Dasineura mariae Sylven, 1993 c g
 Dasineura maritima (Felt, 1909) i c g
 Dasineura markakolica Fedotova, 1996 c g
 Dasineura medicaginis (Bremi, 1847) c g
 Dasineura medullaris (Kieffer, 1892) c g
 Dasineura meibomiae (Beutenmuller, 1907) i c g
 Dasineura meliloti (Felt, 1907) i c g
 Dasineura miki (Kieffer, 1909) c g
 Dasineura mimosae (Kieffer, 1909) c g
 Dasineura minardii (Stefani, 1913) c g
 Dasineura minoterminalis (Stelter, 1969) c g
 Dasineura minungula Stelter, 1986 c g
 Dasineura miranda Fedotova, 1996 c g
 Dasineura modesta (Felt, 1908) i c g
 Dasineura mojynkumensis Fedotova, 1994 c g
 Dasineura multiannulata (Felt, 1908) i c g
 Dasineura multianulata (Felt, 1908) c
 Dasineura myosotidis (Kieffer, 1902) c g
 Dasineura myrciariae Maia, 1996 c g
 Dasineura myrtylli (Rübsaamen, 1916) c g
 Dasineura nasturtii (Rübsaamen, 1916) c g
 Dasineura nervicola (Kieffer, 1909) c g
 Dasineura nipponica (Inouye, 1966) c g
 Dasineura nodosa (Felt, 1907) i c g
 Dasineura nummulariifoliae Fedotova, 1996 c g
 Dasineura obscura (Rondani, 1840) c g
 Dasineura odoratae Stelter, 1982 c g
 Dasineura oldfieldii Kolesik, Adair & Eick, 2005 c g
 Dasineura oleae (Low, 1885) c g
 Dasineura oshanesii Kolesik, Adair & Eick, 2005 c g
 Dasineura oxyacanthae (Rübsaamen, 1914) c g
 Dasineura oxycoccana (Johnson, 1899) i c g
 Dasineura oxytropifolia Fedotova, 1984 c g
 Dasineura oxytropigemma Fedotova, 1984 c g
 Dasineura paeoniae Fedotova, 1989 c g
 Dasineura pallasi Fedotova, 1996 c g
 Dasineura panteli (Kieffer, 1909) c g
 Dasineura papaveris (Winnertz, 1853) c g
 Dasineura papivora Grover & Prasad, 1966 c g
 Dasineura parthenocissi (Stebbins, 1910) i c g b
 Dasineura pedalis (Felt, 1908) i c g
 Dasineura pediculariflorae Fedotova, 2005 c g
 Dasineura peinei (Rübsaamen, 1890) c g
 Dasineura pellex (Osten Sacken, 1862) i c g b  (ash bullet gall midge)
 Dasineura pentaphylloidiflora Fedotova, 1990 c g
 Dasineura pergandei (Felt, 1911) i c g
 Dasineura periclymeni (Rübsaamen, 1889) c g
 Dasineura perigonialis Fedotova, 1996 c g
 Dasineura peyerimhoffi (Kieffer, 1919) c g
 Dasineura phlomicola (Kovalev, 1967) c g
 Dasineura phyteumatis (Low, 1885) c g
 Dasineura piceae (Felt, 1926) i c g
 Dasineura pilifera Kolesik, Adair & Eick, 2005 c g
 Dasineura pilosa  b
 Dasineura pini (Felt, 1907) i c g
 Dasineura piperitae (Felt, 1908) i c g
 Dasineura pirolae (Kieffer, 1909) c g
 Dasineura plectranthi (Kovalev, 1967) c g
 Dasineura plicata (Felt, 1908) i c g
 Dasineura plicatrix (Loew, 1850) c g
 Dasineura poae (Muhle, 1957) c g
 Dasineura polygalae (Kieffer, 1909) c g
 Dasineura populeti (Rübsaamen, 1889) c g
 Dasineura populicola (Marikovskij, 1957) c g
 Dasineura populnea (Kieffer, 1909) c g
 Dasineura porrecta (Felt, 1915) i g
 Dasineura potentillae (Wachtl, 1885) c g
 Dasineura potentillaeflora Fedotova, 2005 c g
 Dasineura praecox Gagne, 1996 c g
 Dasineura pratensis (Kieffer, 1909) c g
 Dasineura praticola (Kieffer, 1892) c g
 Dasineura procera (Rübsaamen, 1914) c g
 Dasineura proxima (Guercio, 1918) c g
 Dasineura prunicola (Low, 1889) c g
 Dasineura pseudacaciae (Fitch, 1859) i c g
 Dasineura pseudococcus (Thomas, 1890) c g
 Dasineura psoraleae Sharma, 1987 c g
 Dasineura pteridicola (Kieffer, 1901) c g
 Dasineura pteridis (Muller, 1871) c g
 Dasineura pudibunda (Osten Sacken, 1862) i c g b
 Dasineura pulsatillae (Kieffer, 1894) c g
 Dasineura pulvini (Kieffer, 1891) c g
 Dasineura purpurea (Felt, 1908) i c g
 Dasineura pustulans (Rübsaamen, 1889) c g
 Dasineura pyri (Bouche, 1847) i c g
 Dasineura quercina (Felt, 1907) i c g
 Dasineura racemi (Felt, 1908) c g
 Dasineura rachiphaga (Tripp, 1955) c g
 Dasineura radifolii (Felt, 1909) i c g
 Dasineura ranunculi (Bremi, 1847) c g
 Dasineura rapunculi (Kieffer, 1906) c g
 Dasineura rhododendri (Kieffer, 1909) c g
 Dasineura rhodophaga (Coquillett, 1900) i c g
 Dasineura rhois (Coquillett, 1900) i c g
 Dasineura ribis (Barnes, 1940) c g
 Dasineura rileyana (Felt, 1909) i c g
 Dasineura rosarum (Hardy, 1850) i c g
 Dasineura rosmarini Tavares, 1902 c g
 Dasineura rossi (Rübsaamen, 1914) c g
 Dasineura rostratae Stelter, 1992 c g
 Dasineura rozhkovi (Mamaev & Nikolskiy, 1983) c g
 Dasineura rubella (Kieffer, 1896) c g
 Dasineura rubiflorae (Felt, 1908) i c g
 Dasineura rubiformis Kolesik, Adair & Eick, 2005 c g
 Dasineura ruebsaameni (Kieffer, 1909) c g
 Dasineura rufescens (Stefani, 1898) c g
 Dasineura rufipedalis (Felt, 1908) i c g
 Dasineura rumicicola (Rübsaamen, 1914) c g
 Dasineura salicifolia (Felt, 1907) i c g
 Dasineura salicifoliae (Osten Sacken, 1866) i c g b
 Dasineura salviae (Kieffer, 1909) c g
 Dasineura sampaina (Tavares, 1902) c g
 Dasineura sanguisorbae (Rübsaamen, 1890) c g
 Dasineura sassafras (Felt, 1916) i c g
 Dasineura saurica Fedotova, 1993 c g
 Dasineura saussureae Fedotova, 1996 c g
 Dasineura saxifragae (Kieffer, 1892) c g
 Dasineura schulzei (Kieffer, 1917) c g
 Dasineura scirpi (Kieffer, 1898) c
 Dasineura scorpii (Kieffer, 1909) c g
 Dasineura scorsonerae Fedotova, 1982 c g
 Dasineura scorzonerifloris Fedotova, 1996 c g
 Dasineura scutata (Felt, 1908) i c g
 Dasineura sedicola (Kovalev, 1967) c g
 Dasineura semenivora (Beutenmuller, 1907) i c g
 Dasineura senebrierae (Kieffer, 1909) c g
 Dasineura seneciocola Fedotova, 1998 c g
 Dasineura senecioflora Fedotova, 1993 c g
 Dasineura senecionis (Rübsaamen, 1925) c
 Dasineura serotina (Winnertz, 1853) c g
 Dasineura serrulatae (Osten Sacken, 1862) i c g b
 Dasineura sesami Grover & Prasad, 1966 c g
 Dasineura setosa (Felt, 1907) i c g
 Dasineura severzovi Fedotova, 1996 c g
 Dasineura shinjii Skuhrava, 1986 c g
 Dasineura sibirica (Marikovskij, 1962) c g
 Dasineura silvestrii (Trotter, 1911) i g
 Dasineura silvestris (Kieffer, 1909) c g
 Dasineura silvicola (Kieffer, 1909) c g
 Dasineura similis (Löw, 1888) c g
 Dasineura simillima (Kieffer, 1913) i c g
 Dasineura sisymbrii (Schrank, 1803) c g
 Dasineura smilacifolia (Felt, 1911) i c g
 Dasineura smilacinae (Bishop, 1911) i c g
 Dasineura socialis (Kieffer, 1909) c g
 Dasineura sodalis (Low, 1877) c g
 Dasineura solonaica Fedotova, 1996 c g
 Dasineura soongarica Fedotova, 1994 c g
 Dasineura spadicea (Rübsaamen, 1917) c g
 Dasineura sphaerophysae Fedotova, 1983 c g
 Dasineura spiraeae (Loiselle, 1912) c g
 Dasineura spiraeina (Felt, 1908) i c g
 Dasineura squamosa (Tavares, 1919) c g
 Dasineura stanleyae (Cockerell, 1914) i c g
 Dasineura stellariae (Rübsaamen, 1916) c g
 Dasineura stelteri Gagne, 2004 c g
 Dasineura storozhenkoi Fedotova, 2003 c g
 Dasineura strobilina (Bremi, 1847) c g
 Dasineura strumosa (Bremi, 1847) c g
 Dasineura subinermis (Kieffer & Herbst, 1911) c g
 Dasineura subterranea (Kieffer, 1909) c g
 Dasineura sulcata Kolesik, Adair & Eick, 2005 c g
 Dasineura swainei (Felt, 1914) i c g
 Dasineura symphyti (Rübsaamen, 1892) c g
 Dasineura syreniae Fedotova, 1994 c g
 Dasineura szepligetii (Kieffer, 1909) c g
 Dasineura tamaricicarpa Fedotova, 1983 c g
 Dasineura tamaricicola Fedotova, 1983 c g
 Dasineura tamariciflora Fedotova, 1983 c g
 Dasineura tanaitica Fedotova, 1992 c g
 Dasineura tavaresi Maia, 1996 c g
 Dasineura tavolga Fedotova, 2002 c g
 Dasineura tetensi (Rübsaamen, 1892) c g
 Dasineura tetragynae (Debski, 1918) c g
 Dasineura tetrahit (Kieffer, 1909) c g
 Dasineura tetrastigma (Felt, 1927) c g
 Dasineura teucrii (Tavares, 1903) c g
 Dasineura theobromae Maia & Vasguez, 2006 c g
 Dasineura thlaspicarpae Fedotova, 1990 c g
 Dasineura thomasi (Kieffer, 1909) c g
 Dasineura thomasiana (Kieffer, 1888) c g
 Dasineura tiliae (Schrank, 1803) c g
 Dasineura tjanshanica Fedotova, 2003 c g
 Dasineura torontoensis (Felt, 1914) i c g
 Dasineura tortilis (Bremi, 1847) c g
 Dasineura tortrix (Low, 1877) c g
 Dasineura toweri (Felt, 1909) i c g
 Dasineura tragonopogonicola Fedotova, 1996 c g
 Dasineura tragopogonicola Fedotova, 1995 c g
 Dasineura traili (Kieffer, 1909) c g
 Dasineura trifolii Loew, 1874 i c g b  (clover leaf midge)
 Dasineura tripolii (Neacs(with line beneath)u, 1968) c g
 Dasineura triseti (Barnes, 1939) c g
 Dasineura trotteri (Tavares, 1902) c g
 Dasineura tuba (Stebbins, 1910) c g
 Dasineura tubicoloides Gagne, 2004 c g
 Dasineura tubularis (Kieffer, 1909) c g
 Dasineura tumidosae (Felt, 1908) i c g b
 Dasineura turgenica Fedotova, 1993 c g
 Dasineura turionum (Kieffer & Trotter, 1904) c g
 Dasineura tympani (Kieffer, 1909) c g
 Dasineura ulicis (Kieffer, 1909) c g
 Dasineura ulmaria (Bremi, 1847) c g
 Dasineura ulmea (Felt, 1908) i c g
 Dasineura ulmicola (Kieffer, 1909) c g
 Dasineura umbrosa (Kieffer, 1909) c g
 Dasineura urnicola (Osten Sacken, 1875) i g
 Dasineura urticae (Perris, 1840) c g
 Dasineura vagans (Kieffer, 1909) c g
 Dasineura valerianae (Kieffer, 1909) c g
 Dasineura vallisumbrosae (Kieffer, 1904) c g
 Dasineura verbasci (Kieffer, 1909) c g
 Dasineura vernalis (Felt, 1908) i c g
 Dasineura verrucosa (Guercio, 1918) c g
 Dasineura viciae (Kieffer, 1888) c g
 Dasineura vicicola (Tavares, 1905) c g
 Dasineura vincae (Kieffer & Trotter, 1904) c g
 Dasineura violae (Low, 1880) c g
 Dasineura violahirtae Stelter, 1982 c g
 Dasineura virgaeaureae (Liebel, 1889) c g
 Dasineura vitis (Felt, 1908) i c g
 Dasineura vitisidaea (Kieffer, 1909) c g
 Dasineura volantis Gagne, 0000 i c g
 Dasineura vulgatiformiae Sylven, 1998 c g
 Dasineura wahlenbergiae Kolesik, 1998 c g
 Dasineura weigelaefolia (Kovalev, 1967) c g
 Dasineura wistariae (Mani, 1954) c g
 Dasineura xylostei (Kieffer, 1909) c g
 Dasineura zillae (Kieffer, 1909) c g
 Dasineura zimmermanni (Tavares, 1901) c g

Data sources: i = ITIS, c = Catalogue of Life, g = GBIF, b = Bugguide.net

References

Dasineura